Eystein Orre (Old Norse: Eysteinn Orri; died 25 September 1066) was a Norwegian noble who was killed at the Battle of Stamford Bridge in 1066.

Eystein was betrothed to King Harald's daughter by Elisiv of Kiev, Maria and according to Heimskringla was "best beloved by the king of all the lendermen". Eystein was among those to accompany Harald in his invasion of England in 1066.

Harald and his army first encountered resistance at Scarborough, where the townsfolk refused to surrender. Harald resorted to burning down the town and this action led to other Northumbrian towns surrendering to him. The army sailed further down the Humber until they disembarked at Riccall. Harald's army then encountered the earls Morcar and Edwin; they fought against Harald's invading army two miles (3 km) south of York at the Battle of Fulford on 20 September. The battle was a decisive victory for the invaders, and led York to surrender to their forces on 24 September.

Early on 25 September, King Harald and Tostig left for York again, leaving a third of their forces behind. Eystein, along with Prince Olaf were among those left behind at Riccall to protect the ships, however a messenger came back calling for reinforcements as the English had intercepted the Norwegians at Stamford Bridge. Eyestein was able to reach his comrades, however King Harald had already been killed. Some of Eyestein's men were said to have collapsed and died of exhaustion upon reaching the battlefield. These men, unlike their comrades, were fully armed for battle. Their counter-attack, described in the Norwegian tradition as "Orre's Storm", briefly stalled the English advance, but was soon overwhelmed and Orre was slain. With the Norwegian army routed and pursued by the English army, some of the fleeing Norsemen drowned in the rivers.

Notes

Citations

Sources
 

11th-century births
1066 deaths
11th-century Norwegian nobility
Norwegian military personnel killed in action
Vikings killed in battle